Gilbert Building may refer to:

Gilbert Building (Beaumont, Texas) in Beaumont, Texas, listed on the National Register of Historic Places in Jefferson County, Texas
Gilbert Building (Portland, Oregon), listed on the National Register of Historic Places in Multnomah County, Oregon
Gilbert Building (Philadelphia, Pennsylvania), listed on the National Register of Historic Places in Philadelphia County, Pennsylvania

See also
Gilbert House (disambiguation)